Devanoora Mahadeva is an Indian writer and intellectual who writes in Kannada language. The Government of India conferred upon him the Padma Shri award, the fourth highest civilian award. 

Known among literary circles to be a rebel, Mahadeva rejected the Nrupatunga Award (carrying a purse of Rs 5,01,000) in 2010. Devanura's rejection of the award was based on his dissatisfaction that despite being the official language of the state, Kannada is yet to be made the primary language of instruction in schools and colleges. He wants Kannada to be made the medium of learning at least up to the college level. Mahadeva is a Central Sahitya Academy awardee for his novel Kusuma Baale. In the 1990s he rejected the government's offer to nominate him to Rajya Sabha (the upper house of the Parliament of India) under the writer's quota. In 2022, he published a book on the RSS that gained popularity and critical acclaim both for its content and its innovative open publishing model.

Personal life
Mahadeva was born in 1948 in Devanuru village in Nanjanagudu Taluk, Mysore district of the Karnataka state, India, He worked at CIIL in Mysore.

Literary contributions
Dyavanooru (ದ್ಯಾವನೂರು)
Odalaala (ಒಡಲಾಳ)
Kusuma Baale (ಕುಸುಮಬಾಲೆ)
Edege Bidda Akshara (ಎದೆಗೆ ಬಿದ್ದ ಅಕ್ಷರ)
Devanura Mahadeva Avara Krithigalu (ದೇವನೂರ ಮಹಾದೇವ ಅವರ ಎಲ್ಲ ಕಥೆ ಕಾದಂಬರಿಗಳು)
RSS: Aaala mattu agala (ಆರ್ ಎಸ್ ಎಸ್: ಆಳ ಮತ್ತು ಅಗಲ)

Awards and recognitions
Devanooru's  awards and accolades include:
 Karnataka Sahitya Academy Award.
 Kendra Sahitya Akademi Award for the novel Kusumabale
 Padma Shri in 2011
 Yara japthigu sigada navilugalu (ಯಾರ ಜಪ್ತಿಗೂ ಸಿಗದ ನವಿಲುಗಳು). Collection of articles on Devanoora Mahadeva`s works and vision edited by Dr. P Chandrika.

See also 
 K. B. Siddaiah
 Siddalingaiah
 C. P. Krishnakumar

References

External links 

 English translation of his book RSS: Aaala mattu agala from the Internet Archive

1948 births
Living people
Kannada-language writers
Bandaya writers
Recipients of the Padma Shri in literature & education
Recipients of the Sahitya Akademi Award in Kannada
Magic realism writers